The Salvadoran Rugby Federation is the governing body for rugby in El Salvador. The Federation also controls the national team, known as the Torogoces. the board directors are as follow : President Fanny Saravia, Treasure Mauricio Mendez, Secretary Fatima Calderon, Directors : Irene Rivera, Vladimir Salguero and Moises Noches

External links
 Official website

Rugby union governing bodies in North America
Rugby union in El Salvador
Sports organizations established in 2009